Piola may refer to:

 Piola (beetle), a genus of beetles
 Piola (Milan Metro), a railway station in Milan, Italy
 Piyāla or piola, a type of bowl for drinking tea
 Valle Piola, a deserted village in the Abruzzo Region of Italy

People with the surname
 Alonso Piola (born 1979), Italian Brazilian footballer
 Domenico Piola (1627–1703), Italian painter
 Gabrio Piola (1794–1850), Italian physicist
 Paolo Gerolamo Piola (1666–1724), Italian painter
 Pellegrino Piola (1617–1640), Italian painter
 Silvio Piola (1913–1996), Italian footballer